Newport News Public Schools (NNPS) is a division of Newport News, Virginia that operates the city's system of public schools. , NNPS had an enrollment of 26,648. NNPS employed about 2,738, including approximately 1,714 teachers.

Governance
NNPS is governed by an elected eight-member school board. Seven of the eight are elected in a ward voting system, while the eighth is selected at large from the entire city. A superintendent implements the school board's policies. George Parker, III was the superintendent of Newport News Public Schools from July 1, 2018, to February 1, 2023, resigning in the wake of the shooting of Abby Zwerner. Parker was previously the superintendent of Caroline County Public Schools.

Division structure 
The schools of NNPS are divided into the three standard levels of American primary and secondary education. , Newport News Public Schools operated 5 early childhood centers, 24 elementary schools, 7 middle schools, 5 high schools, 1 middle/high combination school, and 9 program sites.

High schools

Middle schools

Elementary schools

Early Childhood Centers

Curriculum

Magnet Programs

Newport News Public Schools offers elementary, middle, and high school students the chance to focus on environmental science, communication and performing arts, aviation, global studies, and math, science, technology, and engineering through a variety of magnet and specialty program options. These include:

The Aviation Academy, located at Denbigh High School and the Newport News/Williamsburg International Airport, teaches high school students with an emphasis on engineering, particularly in the field of aviation. The academy also offers students a Pilot Ground School course.

The International Baccalaureate Diploma Program teaches students with an emphasis on international learning. Students at Warwick High School can apply to enter a two-year IB program. They must have completed algebra, a year of a foreign language, and an advanced integrated language-arts class, all with grades of at least B; recommendations from teachers; and at least a 3.0 grade point average. The programs are offered in conjunction with the International Baccalaureate.

Telecommunications

NNPS offers a telecommunications course, other known as Telecom, for high school juniors and seniors. These courses teach the basics of television production and allow students to experience it first-hand at the division's local cable station. This also allows employment opportunities for students to record various events for the school system. These courses are dual enrolled with Norfolk State University. Since the fall of 2021, the Telecom program has partnered with Full Sail University.

Non-Traditional Programs

NNPS offers several programs that differ from a traditional educational curricula. These include:

The Enterprise Academy, an alternative school for students who have been suspended or expelled from their schools or have spent time in correctional facilities, emphasizes business.

New Horizons is a regional education organization.

References

School divisions in Virginia
Education in Newport News, Virginia